Julian Ocleppo and Andrea Vavassori were the defending champions but lost in the first round to Jonathan Eysseric and Andrei Vasilevski.

Denys Molchanov and Igor Zelenay won the title after defeating Guillermo Durán and David Vega Hernández 6–3, 6–2 in the final.

Seeds

Draw

References

External links
 Main draw

Internazionali di Tennis d'Abruzzo - Doubles
Internazionali di Tennis d'Abruzzo